Statistics of Southern New England Soccer League in season 1920-21.

League standings
                           GP   W   L   T   PTS
 Fore River                16  11   2   3   25
 Fall River Rovers         15   7   3   5   19
 J&P Coats                 13   7   3   3   17
 Sayles Finishing Plant    14   4   9   1    9
 St.Michael's               7   1   4   2    4
  disbanded; record taken over by:
 Sharp Mfg. Co.            10   2   5   3    7
 Crompton                  10   0   9   1    1

References
Southern New England Soccer League (RSSSF)

1920-21
1920–21 domestic association football leagues
1920–21 in American soccer